Tour Financial Hub Center is a proposed skyscraper in Seoul, South Korea. It was planned by Jung-gu, Seoul in 2006, with the height of 960m (higher than Burj Khalifa). The completion was planned in 2013.

However, due to the height restrictions in Seoul, construction wasn't allowed and it seems unsure in 2016.

References 

Skyscrapers in Seoul
Proposed skyscrapers